Indispensable may refer to:

Indispensable (1791 ship)
Indispensable (Lucero album), 2010
Indispensable (Michael Franks album)
"Indispensable", single by Chayanne from album Mi Tiempo